The 22nd Bachsas Awards were given by Bangladesh Cholochitra Sangbadik Samity (Bangladesh Cine-Journalists' Association) to outstanding performers of the silver screen, small screen, music, dance and theatre in 1999. Awards was introduced in 1972 to encourage the fledgling film industry of the country.

List of winners

Film

Theatre

References 

Bachsas Awards
Awards established in 1972